is a Japanese manga series written by Mitsuru Nishimura and illustrated by Takuro Kajikawa. It was noted to be adapted into a Japanese television drama series in January 2013.

Plot
A young chef named  is mysteriously transported to the Sengoku period and he also loses most of his memories. He is thrown in the midst of a battle between soldiers, and, as both sides think he is a spy, they hunt him down. During his escape, Ken meets , a young blacksmith girl. Because of his cooking abilities, Ken is soon recruited as personal chef of Oda Nobunaga.

Characters

Heisei Era
Ken’ichirou “Ken” (Yūta Tamamori)
When transported into the Sengoku Era, Ken lost all memories pertaining to his time period. He only remembers how to cook and the history of ingredients and persons. He falls in love with Natsu as the story progresses. He is one of the three people from the Heisei Era to come to Sengoku Era.
He is a genius chef of Nobunaga, who can cook anything from Ming (Chinese) style to Portuguese style. He can cook anything the person asks and create new menus every time. He can make ingredients from scratch. Many ingredients he uses were not known during the time.
Youko (Kashii Yu)
She is the last and only person, other than Ken, to have escaped in chapter 1. She was once Ken's lover during the Heisei Era.
She specializes in sweets.

Sengoku and Azuchi–Momoyama Eras 
Oda Nobunaga (Mitsuhiro Oikawa)
Natsu (Mirai Shida)
She is the person who found Ken during his escape in chapter 1. Dressed as a male, she is a blacksmith that makes Ken's knives. She falls in love with Ken but is heartbroken when she learns about his past with Youko.
Toyotomi Hideyoshi (Gori)
Mori Yoshinari (Takashi Ukaji)
Tokugawa Ieyasu (Takanori Takeyama)
Ashikaga Yoshiaki (Bokuzō Masana)
Kaede (Sei Ashina)

Manga

Drama
The nine-episode first season of the drama was broadcast on TV Asahi between January 11, to March 15, 2013. A second season, consisting of eight episodes, aired also on the same network from July 10, to September 4, 2014.

Season 1

Season 2

Reception
Several volumes of A Chef of Nobunaga have been featured on Oricon's weekly chart of the best-selling manga; volumes 6, 8, 9 and 12 have reached the top 30, while volume 10 reached the 15th spot. The manga has been nominated for Angoulême International Comics Festival's Best Comic.

References

External links
Official website for the TV series 

2011 manga
2013 Japanese television series debuts
2014 Japanese television series endings
Historical anime and manga
Cooking in anime and manga
Houbunsha manga
Japanese television dramas based on manga
Seinen manga
TV Asahi television dramas
Cultural depictions of Oda Nobunaga
Anime and manga about time travel
Sengoku period in fiction